"I Know" is a song by British singer-songwriter Tom Odell. The track was released in the United Kingdom in December 2013 as the fifth and final single from Odell's debut studio album, Long Way Down (2013). The song reached number 92 in the UK Singles Chart.

Track listing

Charts

References

Tom Odell songs
2012 songs
2013 singles
Songs written by Tom Odell
Songs written by Jonny Lattimer
Columbia Records singles